The Order of Antonio José de Irisarri (Spanish: Orden "Antonio José de Irisarri") was founded in 1973 by the government of Guatemala. It was named in honour of the statesman and writer Antonio José de Irisarri. The order has five classes. 

  Collar
  Grand Cross
  Grand Officer
  Commander
  Officer
There are no knights.

Recipients
 Grand Crosses
 Fredrick Chien
 Federico Urruela

References

Orders, decorations, and medals of Guatemala
1973 establishments in Guatemala
Awards established in 1973